Vrgorac is a town in Croatia in the Split-Dalmatia County.

Demographics
The total population of Vrgorac is 6,572 (census 2011), in the following settlements:

 Banja, population 202
 Dragljane, population 52
 Draževitići, population 203
 Duge Njive, population 105
 Dusina, population 494
 Kljenak, population 86
 Kokorići, population 161
 Kotezi, population 278
 Kozica, population 56
 Mijaca, population 95
 Orah, population 268
 Podprolog, population 355
 Poljica Kozička, population 172
 Prapatnice, population 179
 Rašćane, population 130
 Ravča, population 154
 Stilja, population 320
 Umčani, population 227
 Veliki Prolog, population 499
 Vina, population 134
 Višnjica, population 14
 Vlaka, population 41
 Vrgorac, population 2,039
 Zavojane, population 308

In the 2011 census, 99% of the population were Croats.

Prehistory 
In the area Veliki Vanik two early or middle Bronze Age individuals were found, probably Proto-Illyrians, one was genetically determined as haplogroup J2b2a1.

Notable people

 Tin Ujević (1891–1955), poet
 Stipe Božić (born 1951), mountaineer, filmmaker, photographer; second European to climb Mt. Everest twice.
 Nikola Vujčić (born 1978), basketball player and team manager of Maccabi Tel Aviv
 Bonaventura Radonić (1888-1945), Franciscan, philosopher, professor

References

 Vrgorska krajina

External links

Cities and towns in Croatia
Populated places in Split-Dalmatia County